Chad Brock (born July 31, 1963) is an American country music singer and disc jockey. Before beginning his musical career in the late 1990s, he was a professional wrestler in World Championship Wrestling (WCW), until an injury forced him to retire.

Brock signed to Warner Bros. Records' Nashville division in the late 1990s, releasing three studio albums – 1998's Chad Brock, 2000's Yes!, and 2001's III — for WB. Those albums, overall, produced seven singles on the Billboard country music charts, including the number-one hit "Yes!" and the Top Five "Ordinary Life". Brock parted company with Warner Bros. in 2002, and signed to Broken Bow Records a year later; although he released five singles for them (of which four charted), his album for Broken Bow was not released, and he left that label as well.

Brock also began a career in the late 2000s as a disc jockey at WQYK-FM in Tampa, Florida, where he and parody singer Cledus T. Judd co-host a morning show.

Biography
Chad Brock was born July 31, 1963, in Ocala, Florida. In high school, Brock played football and was offered a post-secondary scholarship to play sports. He turned down the scholarship, however, as his experiences in the school choir had convinced him to pursue a singing career. Brock moved to Nashville, Tennessee, to follow this dream, but he met with little success at first. In 1994, he signed a record deal with Warner Bros. Records, but he did not release any music for over three years.

Professional Wrestling Career
Warner Brothers and WCW got together to cross-promote Brock, and he trained at World Championship Wrestling's training facility, the WCW Power Plant. Chad wrestled for WCW from 1994 to 1996, until an injury forced him to retire. He also appeared at several WCW events in 1999, where he was briefly involved in an angle with Curt Hennig.

Musical career
In 1998, Brock released his debut single, "Evangeline", which peaked at number 51 on the Billboard Hot Country Singles & Tracks (now Hot Country Songs) charts. That song's follow-up, the ballad "Ordinary Life", went on to become Brock's first major hit, peaking at number 3 on the same chart, as well as number 39 on the Billboard Hot 100. Following that song's success, Brock released his self-titled debut album. Its third and final single, "Lightning Does The Work", reached number 19 in 1999.

Brock's fourth chart single was a rewrite of Hank Williams, Jr.'s signature song "A Country Boy Can Survive", a number 2 hit for Williams in 1981. Chad's version, which featured Williams and George Jones, was entitled "A Country Boy Can Survive (Y2K Version)", was re-written with lyrics pertaining to the Year 2000 problem (abbreviated Y2K). The song served as the first single from Brock's 2000 album Yes!. Its second single was the title track, which went on to become Brock's only number-one Billboard hit, as well as a number 22 hit on the Hot 100 chart. The third and last single from Yes! ("The Visit") peaked at number 21.

2001 saw the release of Brock's third and final album for Warner Bros.. Entitled III, it was less successful than its predecessor. III had only one chart entry in "Tell Me How", which failed to make the Top 40. This album also reprised Brock's three highest-charting singles ("Yes!", "Ordinary Life" and "Lightning Does The Work"). Shortly thereafter, he signed to Broken Bow Records, then a newly formed independent label. Although he released five singles for Broken Bow, four of which made the charts, he never put out a full album.

Brock left Nashville in 2005 to co-host a morning show on the Tampa, Florida, station WQYK-FM along with country music parodist Cledus T. Judd. He remained on the morning show on WQYK-FM, while Cletus moved on to the Bull in Atlanta. In 2007, Brock signed with Rocky Comfort Records, a label which was started by Tracy Lawrence, although he did not release anything for the label. His first single in four years, "Put A Redneck In The White House", was released in August 2008 on the Straight Shooter label. In February 2010, Brock left WQYK-FM to begin his new position as Director of Programming for the new cable channel The Country Network but left TCN in early 2011.

Discography

Studio albums

Singles

Music videos

Notes

References

1963 births
Living people
Musicians from Ocala, Florida
American country singer-songwriters
American male professional wrestlers
American radio personalities
Country musicians from Florida
Warner Records artists
BBR Music Group artists
Singer-songwriters from Florida